The 245th Infantry Division was an infantry division of the German Heer during World War II. It was active between 1943 and 1945.

Operational history 
The 245th Infantry Division was formed on 8 July 1943 as a static infantry division in the Rouen area in occupied France. It initially consisted of the Grenadier Regiments 935, 936 and 937, as well as the Artillery Regiment 245. The division's initial commander was Erwin Sander.

The division was in the Fécamp area during the beginning of the Allied Operation Overlord. While it did not fight the Allies immediately, it saw combat during the Allied drive into the Low Countries. In September 1944, it was in the Arnhem area Between 2 October and 8 November, the 245th Division fought in the Battle of the Scheldt. It was briefly withdrawn from the frontline to be reinforced, but returned to face U.S. 3rd Army forces before the end of the year 1944. It fought in northern Alsace in early 1945, and was once again sent to the reserves to be reinforced on 1 March 1945. It surrendered to British forces in the Schleswig-Holstein area.

Superior formations 
At the corps level, the 245th Infantry Division served at times under LXXXI, LXVII, LXXXIX, LXXXVIII, LXXXVIII, and LXXXIX Army Corps. At the army level, the division served at times under 15th and 1st Armies. At the army group level, the division served at times under Army Group D, Army Group B and Army Group G.

Noteworthy individuals 

 Erwin Sander, divisional commander starting 8 September 1943.
 Kuno Dewitz, divisional commander starting 1 April 1945.

References 

Infantry divisions of Germany during World War II
Military units and formations established in 1943
Military units and formations disestablished in 1945